Marc Godelman (born November 20, 1990) is an American soccer player who most recently played for Wilmington Hammerheads in the USL Pro.

Career

College and amateur
Godelman played college soccer with St. John's University and Stony Brook University.

Professional
Godelman signed with German Oberliga Mittelrhein (5th tier) club TSV Germania Windeck on January 1, 2014 where he spent six months. After a brief trial, Godelman joined USL Pro club Wilmington Hammerheads.

References

1990 births
Living people
American soccer players
St. John's Red Storm men's soccer players
Stony Brook Seawolves men's soccer players
Jersey Express S.C. players
Wilmington Hammerheads FC players
Association football midfielders
USL League Two players
USL Championship players